KFYR (550 kHz) is an AM radio station located in Bismarck, North Dakota, owned by iHeartMedia, Inc. It transmits on a 5,000-watt signal that can be heard in seven U.S. states and three Canadian provinces. KFYR also broadcasts on translator K259AF (99.7 FM) in Bismarck. 99.7 FM was previously a simulcast of KQDY 94.5 FM before 2011.

KFYR boasts an enormous coverage area.  It can be heard across almost all of North Dakota during the day, as well as in parts of Minnesota, South Dakota, Montana, Manitoba and Saskatchewan. Under the right conditions, it can be heard in parts of Nebraska. This owes to a combination of its position only one channel from the bottom of the North American AM dial, the height and power of its transmitter, and North Dakota's flat land.  On the AM band, lower frequencies have longer waves, which tend to travel farther across terrain. This is especially true for stations that operate at 5,000 watts or more.  Additionally, the flat landscape of the prairies makes for near-perfect ground conductivity, giving KFYR a coverage area comparable to that of a full-power FM station. At night, two towers are used in a directional pattern to protect CBK, the CBC Radio One outlet for most of Saskatchewan, which operates on nearby 540 AM. Even with this restriction, it still covers almost all of North Dakota at night.  KFYR is the primary entry point station for the Emergency Alert System in both North and South Dakota.

It has been claimed that KFYR has the largest daytime coverage area of any AM radio station in the United States. A similar claim can be made for WNAX in Yankton, South Dakota, which transmits on 570AM.

History
KFYR was founded in 1925 by Phillip J. Meyer and his wife, Etta Hoskins Meyer. It is Bismarck's oldest radio station. For many years, it was an NBC radio affiliate. In December 1953 it spawned a television station (KFYR-TV, western North Dakota's NBC television affiliate, and its three semi-satellites) and in 1966, KFYR-FM at 92.9 (now KYYY) began operation. At one time, the Meyer Broadcasting Company roster also included AM radio stations in Billings and Great Falls, Montana, as well as an FM station in Minot, North Dakota. 

Marietta Meyer Ekberg, the Meyers' daughter, retired in 1998, and her radio holdings were sold to Jacor Communications, which in turn was acquired in 1999 by the present owner, iHeartMedia.

KFYR began operation with programming for only a few hours daily, signing off between shows. By 1950, the station had expanded its schedule to an 18-hour broadcast day. Early programming included live studio musicians, transcribed music and programs, and live feeds from the NBC Radio Network. Many popular "soap operas", sporting events, religious broadcasts, children's programs, and musical performances were part of the regular schedule. The station carried NBC's Monitor on weekends, and Nightline on weeknights. Other programming included local news, weather, and sports, locally originated variety programs such as "What's The Weather" weekday mornings and "The Northwest Farmfront" weekdays at noon. Mike Dosch, an established musician from Strasburg, North Dakota (Lawrence Welk's hometown) was featured on several of the live shows and had his own late-night program of organ music for many years. There were also shows hosted by staff announcers who played recorded popular music by such artists as Nat King Cole, Doris Day, The Ames Brothers, Fred Waring and the Pennsylvanians, and orchestras including Mantovani, Percy Faith, and Frank Chacksfield.

Facing stiff competition from less formal local stations along with regional outlets in Fargo, Minot, and Jamestown, North Dakota and Winnipeg, Canada, KFYR began to see its dominance and audience decline in the early 1960s and switched to a Top 40 format. It was very popular with teenagers by virtue of its "torrid twenty" countdown show, which featured the twenty popular hits of the week. In the 1960s and 1970s, teenagers from South Dakota to parts of Canada enjoyed listening to "their" music on KFYR every evening (along with KOMA from Oklahoma City, KAAY from Little Rock, WLS from Chicago, and KSTP from St Paul).

KFYR gained brief national notoriety in 1979, when the station was sued in federal court by the Pointer Sisters and Elektra Records, for KFYR's remix of their cover of Bruce Springsteen's "Fire" with "K-Fire" dubbed into the chorus where "fire" would be said; the suit was settled out of court.

KFYR once broadcast in AM stereo, beginning with the Harris system in the mid-1980s, and later switching to the Motorola C-QUAM system. KFYR discontinued broadcasting in AM stereo around the turn of the millennium.

Today, KFYR runs a news/talk format, with coverage of Minnesota Vikings and University of Mary football games, and high school sporting events, being provided. The station formerly picked up a mix of adult contemporary music on weekends and a Saturday night oldies program.

Translator
KFYR also broadcasts on the following FM translator:

References

External links
KFYR website

FCC History Cards for KFYR

FYR
News and talk radio stations in the United States
Radio stations established in 1925
IHeartMedia radio stations